Tom Mansharov (born 15 April 1987 in Tel Aviv) is an Israeli footballer who last played for Ironi Ramat HaSharon in the  Israeli Premier League. Born in Tel Aviv, Mansharov is of Bulgarian descent.

References

External links
Stats at pfcslavia.com

1987 births
Living people
Israeli footballers
Israeli expatriate footballers
Maccabi Tel Aviv F.C. players
Hapoel Petah Tikva F.C. players
Hapoel Nir Ramat HaSharon F.C. players
PFC Slavia Sofia players
Expatriate footballers in Bulgaria
Israeli expatriate sportspeople in Bulgaria
First Professional Football League (Bulgaria) players
Israeli Premier League players
Liga Leumit players
Footballers from Tel Aviv
Israeli people of Bulgarian-Jewish descent
Association football midfielders